The 1914 Akron Indians season was their seventh season in existence. The team played in the Ohio League and posted a 9-2-1 record to win their fourth state title.

Schedule

Game notes

References

Pro Football Archives: Akron Indians 1914

Akron Pros seasons
Akron Pros
Akron Pros